Ildar Garifullin; born 27 May 1963 in Ufa) is a former Soviet/Russian nordic combined skier who competed in the early 1980s.  He won a bronze medal in the 3 x 10 km team event at the 1984 FIS Nordic World Ski Championships in Rovaniemi. Garifullin's best individual finish was 5th in West Germany in 1984.

He also competed in the Nordic combined event at the 1984 Winter Olympics.

References

External links 
 

1963 births
Living people
Soviet male Nordic combined skiers
FIS Nordic World Ski Championships medalists in Nordic combined
Russian male Nordic combined skiers
Olympic Nordic combined skiers of the Soviet Union
Nordic combined skiers at the 1984 Winter Olympics
Sportspeople from Ufa